Incurvaria circulella is a moth of the  family Incurvariidae. It is found in Fennoscandia and northern Russia.

The wingspan is 16–21 mm. Adults are on wing from June to mid-July.

The larvae feed on Betula nana and Betula pubescens czerepanovii. They mine the leaves of their host plant.

References

External links
Lepiforum.de

Moths described in 1839
Incurvariidae
Moths of Europe
Taxa named by Johan Wilhelm Zetterstedt